Salto del Guairá Airport Airport  is an airport serving the city of Salto del Guairá in Canindeyú Department, Paraguay.

See also

 List of airports in Paraguay
 Transport in Paraguay

References

External links
 HERE Maps - Salto del Guairá Airport
 OpenStreetMap - Salto del Guairá Airport
 Skyvector Aeronautical Charts - Salto del Guairá Airport

Airports in Paraguay